Roschdy Zem (born 27 September 1965) is a French actor and filmmaker of Moroccan descent. He shared the award for Best Actor for his role in the film Days of Glory at the 2006 Cannes Film Festival.

Career
Versatile and determined to not be typecast in "Beur" roles, Roschdy Zem developed his range, playing a General of Napoléon in Monsieur N. (2003), a Jewish father in Va, vis et deviens (Live and Become, 2005), and a transvestite in Change moi ma vie (Change My Life, 2001) alongside Fanny Ardant. He also appeared in roles highlighting issues in mainstream French society as well as in films promoting aspects of French and North African history such as Indigènes (Days of Glory, 2006) and Camping à la ferme (2005), based on a script from Azouz Begag.

In 2011, he directed the film Omar Killed Me, which was selected as the Moroccan entry for the Best Foreign Language Film at the 84th Academy Awards.

Selected filmography

As actor 
 1987: Les keufs
 1991: I Don't Kiss
 1993: My Favorite Season
 1995: Don't Forget You're Going to Die
 1996: The Best Job in the World
 1997: L'autre côté de la mer
 1998: Those Who Love Me Can Take the Train
 1998: Alice et Martin
 1998: For Sale
 1998: Louise (Take 2)
 2000: Stand-by
 2001: Change moi ma vie
 2001: My Wife Is an Actress
 2002: The Race
 2003: Merci Docteur Rey
 2003: Sansa
 2004: 36
 2005: Va, Vis et Deviens
 2005: Camping à la ferme
 2005: Le Petit Lieutenant
 2006: Indigènes
 2006: La Californie
 2006: Mauvaise foi (also written and directed)
 2007: Game of Four
 2008: La fille de Monaco
 2008: Go Fast
 2008: La très très grande entreprise
 2009: Commis d'office
 2009: London River
 2010: Outside the Law
 2010: Point Blank
 2010: Turk's Head
 2010: Happy Few
 2012: The Cold Light of Day, by Mabrouk El Mechri, as Zahir
 2012: Une nuit, by Philippe Lefebvre, as Simon Weiss
 2012: Mains armées, by Pierre Jolivet, as Lucas Scali
 2012: Just like a Woman, by Rachid Bouchareb
 2012: Collision, by David Marconi
 2014: Bird People, by Pascale Ferran, as Simon
 2014: La Rançon de la gloire
 2014: On a failli être amies
 2015: Alaska
 2017: Les hommes du feu by Pierre Jolivet
 2017: The Price of Success
 2018: Nothing to Hide
 2019: Oh Mercy!
 2019: Savages (Les Sauvages) – TV series
 2021: Madame Claude
 2022: Other People's Children (:fr:Les enfants des autres)

As filmmaker

Awards and nominations

References

External links 

1965 births
Living people
People from Gennevilliers
French male film actors
French people of Moroccan descent
French male television actors
20th-century French male actors
21st-century French male actors
French film directors
French male screenwriters
French screenwriters
French film producers
Cannes Film Festival Award for Best Actor winners
Best Actor César Award winners
Best Actor Lumières Award winners